Stave dancing is a style of folk dance from the south-west of England, especially Somerset, Dorset, and Wiltshire. Teams of dancers carry long decorated poles, known as staves, over their shoulders whilst performing. Having effectively died-out in the 1920s, interest in the style revived in the 1980s, and today a number of Morris and country dancing teams perpetuate the tradition. Some claim the tradition's origins lie in the annual ‘club-walks’ of the friendly societies.

Dancing style
Stave dances are, essentially, English country dances adapted to have dancers perform whilst carrying a stave over their right shoulder. They are performed by mixed groups of dancers, organised into sets of four, six, eight, or more who perform figures to the accompaniment of traditional country dance tunes.   The steps are similar to those used in some Morris and country dances including double-stepping, a travelling ‘ranting’ or ‘polka’ step, and a country dance ‘chasing’ step - also known as a 'Dorset skip-change' step. Whilst the staves are mainly carried on the shoulder, some dances require the dancers to form arches or other figures. Few original dances are known—most of those now performed originate from a small group of villages in Somerset and Dorset—notably Stourton Caundle and Fifehead Magdalen although many new dances have been choreographed within the style.

Equipment and dress
It is claimed that dancing staves evolved from the staves carried by friendly society stewards and some members on formal occasions. These, in turn, replicated the civic staves that civic dignitaries had carried for centuries.  Modern dancing staves consist of a wooden pole, typically four to six feet in length, topped with an emblem of either wood or brass and often decorated with ribbons. Although colours varied, blue was a common friendly society livery. Each society had its own dress code so one can only generalize. Most societies required all their members to be “decently dressed”, especially on club walks. This usually meant that everyone turned out in their “Sunday best”. For the stewards, black coats were invariably the order, often tail coats. A blue sash was also common for stewards. One society prescribed that stewards must wear white moleskin trousers, whilst another specifically banned smocks. Hats were required – usually top hats for stewards with bowlers or caps for members. Hats were usually decorated with ribbons, again usually blue, or with a blue cockade at the front or side. The Broadway Friendly Society of Ilminster stipulated that it was the duty of each steward: “To go to church with his pole and brass knob and one blue ribbon on it, and one blue knot in his hat”. The Hatch Beauchamp Friendly Society near Taunton stipulated that “the pole must be blue and not less than a yard and a half of blue ribbon attached”. Modern stave dancing teams sometimes copy these styles of dress and equipment.

Origins
The English Folk Dance and Song Society submits that the origins of stave dancing may lie in the ‘club walks’ of the friendly societies in the south-west of England during the middle years of the nineteenth century. In addition to their principal function of providing sickness and death benefits, friendly societies also had a lively social side intended to foster fraternity amongst their members. This manifested itself in the annual ‘club walk’, a social occasion that usually involved a parade, church service, and dinner, along with music and other entertainments. During these events, the members and stewards of many societies carried staves as a symbol of office. It is claimed that, at some club-walks in the south-west, members took to performing both processional and contemporary country dances whilst carrying their staves, leading to the development of the stave dancing tradition. Few primary sources are known although a letter in the Helm Collection at University College, London gives an account of stave dancing during club walks in Shrawley, Worcestershire around 1880:

Such other contemporary references as are known to exist, mostly newspaper reports and friendly society minute books, suggest that the tradition had died out by the late 1920s, the last recorded instance being at Shepton Beauchamp, near Ilminster, in 1928.

Revival
The modern revival of stave dancing may be attributed almost entirely to the efforts of one man, Roy Dommett, who claimed to have re-discovered the tradition, and subsequently went on to regenerate interest in it. A former scientist and noted researcher and teacher of folk dancing, Dommett uncovered a number of references to stave dancing, including primary-source material that was supplied by Maud Karpeles, whilst researching other aspects of English folk dance in the 1970s. After examining as many contemporary references as could be found, he concluded that stave dancing not only grew out of the social activities of the south-western friendly societies, but that it represented a distinct style of English folk-dance worthy of standing alongside other English dancing traditions; conclusive evidence of many of whose origins is equally obscure. Little in the way of reliable choreography or musical notation could be found and so, with the help of one or two morris dancing teams including Bath City Morris and Abercorn Morris, Dommett re-choreographed a number of dances: 

 

For many years he strove to see the tradition become accepted as a bona fide style of English folk-dance and to encourage its performance through a series of workshops and lectures. Today, variations of Dommett’s dances, together with many new dances created within the tradition, are performed by a small number of Morris dancing teams across the south-west of England including Somerset Morris, Fleur-de-Lys Morris and Bradninch Millers.

References 

English folk dance